Yannick Noah was the defending champion, but lost in the semifinals this year.

Yahiya Doumbia won the title, beating Todd Nelson 6–4, 3–6, 6–3 in the final.

Seeds

  Yannick Noah (semifinals)
  Andrei Chesnokov (first round)
  Kelly Evernden (quarterfinals)
  Guy Forget (second round)
  Scott Davis (second round)
  Thierry Tulasne (second round)
  Tarik Benhabiles (first round)
  Jeremy Bates (quarterfinals)

Draw

Finals

Top half

Bottom half

External links
 Main draw

1988 Grand Prix (tennis)